Sarra Hamdi (born 13 March 1999) is a Tunisian freestyle wrestler. She is a silver medalist at the African Games and a five-time medalist, including gold, at the African Wrestling Championships. She competed at the 2020 Summer Olympics, in the women's 50 kg event.

Career 

She represented Tunisia at the 2019 African Games and she won the silver medal in the women's freestyle 50 kg event.

In 2020, she won one of the bronze medals in the women's freestyle 50 kg event at the African Wrestling Championships held in Algiers, Algeria. She qualified at the 2021 African & Oceania Wrestling Olympic Qualification Tournament to represent Tunisia at the 2020 Summer Olympics in Tokyo, Japan.

In 2022, she competed in the 50 kg event at the Yasar Dogu Tournament held in Istanbul, Turkey. She won the gold medal in her event at the 2022 African Wrestling Championships held in El Jadida, Morocco. A few months later, she won the bronze medal in the 50 kg event at the 2022 Mediterranean Games held in Oran, Algeria. She also won the bronze medal in the 50 kg event at the 2021 Islamic Solidarity Games held in Konya, Turkey.

Achievements

References

External links 
 
 
 

Living people
1999 births
Place of birth missing (living people)
Tunisian female sport wrestlers
African Games silver medalists for Tunisia
African Games medalists in wrestling
Competitors at the 2019 African Games
African Wrestling Championships medalists
Wrestlers at the 2020 Summer Olympics
Olympic wrestlers of Tunisia
Competitors at the 2022 Mediterranean Games
Mediterranean Games bronze medalists for Tunisia
Mediterranean Games medalists in wrestling
Islamic Solidarity Games medalists in wrestling
Islamic Solidarity Games competitors for Tunisia
21st-century Tunisian women